Márton Esterházy (born 9 April 1956 in Budapest) is a Hungarian retired professional footballer. He is a descendant of the Esterházy aristocratic family. After retiring, like his famous writer brother Péter Esterházy, he became a published author himself as well. He is also the head of the Hungarian Futsal Committee, and in February 2007 became a UEFA controller.

Club career
Esterházy played for Budafoki LC, Ferencváros and Honvéd, until he was acquired by AEK Athens. At AEK it didn't take long for him to impress, alongside Thomas Mavros and Hokan Sandberg they composed a "magical" triplet in the mid-80s. Highlight of his career on the goal of Pavlos Papaioannou against the Real Madrid on 18 September 1985, when with a jump over the ball he confused the opposing goalkeeper Ochotorena, as a result of which it ended up in his net.

In December 1986 as his performance had begun to decline, he left AEK and joined Panathinaikos. He played for the "greens" for 1.5 years, but without much success. He then moved to Austria to play for Casino Salzburg. In 1989 he traveled to Switzerland for Chênois and Bulle. He ended his career in Weissenbach.

International career
He scored 11 goals for the Hungarian national team, and was a participant at the 1986 FIFA World Cup in Mexico, where Hungary failed to progress from the group stage. Esterházy scored the first goal in the 2–0 win against Canada.

References

External links
 Márton Esterházy at magyarfutball.hu

1956 births
Living people
Footballers from Budapest
Nemzeti Bajnokság I players
Budapest Honvéd FC players
Ferencvárosi TC footballers
AEK Athens F.C. players
Panathinaikos F.C. players
Super League Greece players
Hungarian footballers
Hungarian expatriate footballers
Hungary international footballers
1986 FIFA World Cup players
Expatriate footballers in Greece
Expatriate footballers in Switzerland
Hungarian writers
Marton Esterhazy
CS Chênois players
Association football forwards
Budafoki LC footballers